Jugovići is a village situated in Loznica municipality in Serbia.

References

Populated places in Mačva District